Claris Resolve was a spreadsheet computer program for the Apple Macintosh. It was released by Claris in 1991 and sold until 1994.

In an effort to flesh out their software suite, in the early 1990s Claris wanted to introduce a spreadsheet application, and decided to buy an existing one. This was not particularly difficult, as Informix had essentially abandoned the Mac version of WingZ, and Claris was able to purchase the non-exclusive rights to the codebase. After changing the interface to conform to their new "Pro" line of product's GUI, they released it at the MacWorld Expo Boston on June 6, 1991, as Resolve.

Resolve supports a worksheet size of more than one billion cells and includes 149 built-in functions that allow users to create financial, statistical and mathematical models. Resolve also contains object-oriented, MacDraw-like drawing tools for combining illustrations, clip art, text, charts and numbers in reports. Resolve also included WingZ scripting language, renamed Resolve Script. Resolve also offered 3D charting that Wingz was the first to bring on Macintosh.

Resolve failed to gain significant market share due to Microsoft Excel, which also stopped Lotus 1-2-3 becoming popular on the Macintosh. This led to disappointing sales, and in 1993 development was stopped. On 31 March 1994 Claris stopped selling Resolve, the program was supported up until 31 March 1995. Claris suggested existing Resolve users to upgrade to the spreadsheet module of ClarisWorks.

Reception

Resolve 1.0v3 got  mice (out of 5) in June 1992 issue of MacUser, praising the familiar interface and the scripting.

References

External links 
 TidBITS#76/12-Aug-91 Claris Resolve introduction information
 TidBITS#216/07-Mar-94 Claris Resolve discontinuation info
 Claris Resolve Information and Screenshots on knubbelmac.de

Macintosh-only software
Spreadsheet software